Yun-seong, also spelled Yoon-sung, Yun-song, is a Korean unisex given name. Its meaning differs based on the hanja used for each syllable. There are 15 hanja with the reading "yun" and 27 hanja with the reading "seong" on the South Korean government's official list of hanja which may be used in given names.

People with this name include:
Gang Yun-seong (died 1358), father of Queen Sindeok of the Joseon dynasty
Hong Yun-seong (1425–1475), Joseon dynasty general
Gaeko (born Kim Yoon-sung, 1981), South Korean rapper
K (singer) (born Kang Yoon-sung, 1983), South Korean singer
Jung Yoon-sung (born 1984), South Korean football forward
Kang Yoon-sung (born 1997), South Korean football midfielder
Chung Yun-seong (born 1998), South Korean tennis player

Fictional characters with this name include:
Hong Yun-seong, character in the Soul series of video games, introduced in the 2002 game Soulcalibur II
Lee Yoon-sung, character in the 2011 South Korean television series City Hunter

See also
List of Korean given names

References

Korean unisex given names